When Babur, the founder of the Mughal dynasty conquered northern India in 1526, the wealth of the country already largely depended on foreign trade, exporting India's enormous production of many types of commodities, in particular textiles.  These left India by land and by sea, the latter in relatively small ships making relatively short voyages from the east and west coasts, as they had done for centuries.  But political changes in the lands between Europe and India meant that Indian exports to Europe were probably much less than at the peak of the Roman Empire.

Premises of the Mughal empire for the trade 
 
Contact between Western Europe and the Mughal empire was put into practice in the very beginning of the 17th century. The Portuguese, English, and later on, the Dutch were the ones to trade with the Mughal empire. As the first Islamic power on the Indian subcontinent, the Mughal empire was more interested in assimilating the land, studying the history, customs and religion of the people occupying this area, and communicating with the other two Islamic empires – the Saffavid and the Ottoman Empires. 

The Mughal empire was blessed with very strong leaders, however, very different in approach and strategy. Akbar was known for his tolerance towards unorthodox Muslims and Hindus. The Akbarnama, a book written by Abu’l Fazl on the life and rule of Akbar, gives a lot of evidence on how Hinduism was viewed and explained by the Muslims. Along with being tolerant towards his Hindu and Muslim subjects, Akbar welcomed Portuguese Jesuits, which allowed Portugal to enter the trade with Indian goods. At the very end of his rule, the British, Dutch, and Portuguese started to trade with the Mughal empire as well. Even though the trade started during the reign of Akbar the Great, his son Jahangir was the one to strengthen this economic activity in the Indian subcontinent.

Premises of Western Europe for the trade 

The English and Dutch were granted 21-year permission of monopoly in the “East Indies”, which followed by the retorted answer from the Indian kings – they encouraged the establishment of coastal posts for trade.  Half a century afterwards, the competition for trade in the Indian Ocean was enhanced by the establishment of the East India Company in 1664. It followed Jean-Baptiste Colbert's theory of mercantilism that claimed to keep the national exports greater than the imports. In his Memorandum on English Alliances and Memorandum to the King on Finances written in 1669 and 1670 respectively, Jean-Baptiste Colbert defended his theory and tried to figure out a way of how to undercut the Dutch trade. This document gave evidence on the strength of the Netherlands’ trade in the 17th century not only in India but also in the Caribbean. Moreover, it gave the precise numbers of the Dutch superiority over both the British and the French – 15,000 to 16,000 vessels per year versus 3,000 to 4,000 for the British and 500 to 600 for the French. The British managed to increase the trade with textile with 22.7 million square meters over a period of just twenty years. They did that in the same year that France intervened in the Indian trade.

The implementation of trade on the local level in India and the various trading posts 

The trade in India was implemented mainly on the coast. During the 17th century there were two big Islamic empires between Western Europe and the Mughal empire – the Saffavid and the Ottoman Empires – their trade was implemented only by ships. Therefore, the main ports were on the coast of both the Arabian Sea and the Bay of Bengal with the small exception of Calcutta, located on the bank of river Hooghly, yet still accessible by water. Bombay and Surat on the Arabian sea coast and Madras (today’s Chennai) or - as the British named it - Fort St. George, were the four main locations of Indo-European trade during the 17th century. Trade as a tool for the Early World Globalization was very prosperous and profitable for both the European and the Indian merchants. Consequently, the local Indian landlords gained a lot of power and money. Since the emperor’s power was not as centralized and certainly was not recognized by all of the people of different origin living within the borders of the Mughal empire, the local potentates stood against the emperor and formed autonomous or semiautonomous states. This separation made it easy afterwards for the already penetrated British powers to put the end of the Mughal empire in the mid 19th century.

References 

Andrea, Alfred J. and James H. Overfield. The Human Record: Sources Of Global History (selections from primary sources): Boston, MA: Houghton Mifflin Company, 2005.
Chatterjee, Prasun. The Lives of Alcohol in Pre-colonial India: The Medieval History Journal 2005; 8; 189.
“East India Company Factory Records”. Adam Matthew Publications Ltd. Pelham House, London Road, Marlborough, Wiltshire, SN8 2AA, England, East India Company Factory Records
 Keay, John, India, a History, 2000, HarperCollins, 
Worlds Entangled: 1600-1750. 21, 22.

Mughal Empire
Early Modern period
17th century in India
17th century in Europe
Age of Sail
Foreign trade of India
Economic history of India